Ahkal Moʼ Nahb II also known as Chaacal II and Akul Anab II, (September 3, 523 – July 21, 570) was an ajaw of the Maya city-state of Palenque. He took the throne on May 2, 565, eighty-five days after the death of Kʼan Joy Chitam I. He was the grandson of Ahkal Moʼ Nahb I and probably the brother of Kan Bahlam I.

Notes

Sources 

523 births
570 deaths
Rulers of Palenque
6th-century monarchs in North America
6th century in the Maya civilization